Marruecos may refer to:

 a Spanish proper noun meaning "Morocco"
 Marrakech, a major Moroccan city
 Marocco (see), its former Roman Catholic diocese, now a Latin Catholic titular see
 Marruecos (Santurce), a sector of San Juan, the capital city of Puerto Rico